Declana toreuta is a species of moth in the family Geometridae. It is endemic to New Zealand.

References

Moths of New Zealand
Moths described in 1929
Endemic fauna of New Zealand
Ennominae
Taxa named by Edward Meyrick
Endemic moths of New Zealand